MullenLowe U.S. is a Boston, Massachusetts-based advertising and marketing communications agency, a part of MullenLowe Group owned by multinational advertising network Interpublic Group of Companies (IPG). It has regional offices in Los Angeles, New York City and Winston-Salem, North Carolina.  The agency provides creative, media, brand planning, direct-marketing, interactive, design, and public relations.

Lee Newman is MullenLowe U.S.'s CEO.

History 
MullenLowe U.S., originally known as Mullen Advertising, was founded in 1970 in Wenham, Massachusetts by Jim Mullen, a biophysicist and racing sailor. Three years later, the company hired Paul Silverman as its original creative director. Other early employees included then-Chief Operating Officer Joe Grimaldi, who would go on to become Chairman of MullenLowe U.S., and the agency's fourth partner and executive creative director Edward Boches.

In April 1999, Mullen Advertising, by then the largest independent agency in New England, was acquired by Interpublic Group of Companies. In October 1999, Jim Mullen stepped down and turned the CEO duties over to Joe Grimaldi.

In January 2001, Interpublic merged Mullen with another of its holdings, Winston-Salem, North Carolina-based agency Long Haymes Carr (LHC).  LHC was renamed as Mullen/LHC.

In 2011, the agency was named to Ad Age's A-List as the third best agency in the country.  In the same year, American business magazine Fast Company named Mullen to its top 10 innovative marketing and advertising companies.

In December 2013, Alex Leikikh succeeded Joe Grimaldi as Mullen's CEO.

In May 2015, Interpublic merged Mullen with global agency Lowe & Partners, creating MullenLowe Group, and Mullen's US offices were renamed as MullenLowe U.S. Mullen CEO Alex Leikikh became Worldwide CEO of MullenLowe Group. Lee Newman was appointed MullenLowe U.S. CEO.

Operations 
MullenLowe U.S. is headquartered at 40 Broad Street in Boston, where it moved on June 1, 2009, following 22 years in a manor house in Wenham, Massachusetts. Additional offices are located in Los Angeles, New York City, and Winston-Salem North Carolina. The agency is part of MullenLowe Group's network of 90+ offices in over 65 locations around the world.

MullenLowe U.S. belongs to the similarly-named division of the global network, MullenLowe, which focuses on brand strategy, communications planning and through-the-line advertising. MullenLowe sits alongside three other divisions of MullenLowe Group: MullenLowe Comms, Mediahub, and MullenLowe Profero.

Notable campaigns

One of MullenLowe U.S.'s more notable campaigns was creating the Monster.com Super Bowl commercial When I Grow Up. The agency has also gotten press coverage for its E*TRADE Superbowl ads with the tagline "Don't Get Mad, Get E-Trade".. In 2022, KFC has named MullenLowe as the brand's creative agency of record.

Notable clients past and present

References

External links

Advertising agencies of the United States
Interpublic Group
Companies based in Boston
Companies based in Essex County, Massachusetts
Economy of Detroit
Economy of Pittsburgh
Economy of Winston-Salem, North Carolina
1970 establishments in Massachusetts
American companies established in 1970